The 2020–21 East Premiership (known as the McBookie.com East Premiership for sponsorship reasons) was the 19th season of league competition for SJFA East Region member clubs. This was effectively a continuation of the East Superleague but with fewer member clubs in the East Region all teams were in a single tier with no promotion or relegation.

The league was renamed to East Premiership and was split into North and South regional divisions, containing 17 and 13 teams respectively. The winners of each division were due to play each other in a play-off to determine the overall champion. The start of the league season was delayed until November 2020 because of the COVID-19 pandemic, and games were played behind closed doors due to Scottish Government restrictions. Lochee United continued as the reigning champions due to the previous season being declared null and void.

On 7 January 2021 the East Region chose to suspend the season until 6 February, due to new restrictions in place because of the rising number of COVID-19 cases. On 16 March the Scottish Junior Football Association's  management committee ended the season declared all competitions null and void for a second successive season.

Teams
The following teams changed division after the 2019–20 season.

To East Superleague
Promoted from East Premier League North
 Arbroath Victoria
 Blairgowrie
 Brechin Victoria
 Coupar Angus
 Dundee Violet
 East Craigie
 Forfar United
 Lochee Harp

Promoted from East Premier League South
 Bo'ness United Junior
 Linlithgow Rose Community
 Sauchie Juniors Community
 Stoneyburn
 Syngenta
 West Calder United

From East Superleague
Transferred to East of Scotland League
 Luncarty
 Kennoway Star Hearts
 Lochore Welfare
 Thornton Hibs

North

Stadia and locations

League table

Results
Each team was due to play every other team once, for a total of 16 fixtures.

South

Stadia and locations

Withdrew

League table

Results
Each team was due to play every other team twice, for a total of 22 fixtures.

References

External links

6
East Superleague seasons
East Premiership